Kristine DeBell (born December 10, 1954) is an American film actress.

Career
Born in Chatham, New York, DeBell began her career as a fashion model with Ford Models. She later moved into acting, debuting as the star of the 1976 erotic musical comedy film Alice in Wonderland at the age of 21.

She was on the April 1976 cover of Playboy, photographed by Suze Randall. She also appeared in Playboy's classic August 1976 Helmut Newton pictorial "200 Motels, or How I Spent My Summer Vacation", from which 11 original prints were sold at auctions of the Playboy archives by Butterfields in 2002 for $21,075, and three by Christie's in December 2003 for $26,290.

Subsequently, she moved to mainstream film and television. Her most prominent film roles included playing A.L., a camp counselor, alongside Bill Murray, in the comedy Meatballs (1979) and Jackie Chan's girlfriend in The Big Brawl (1980). She appeared in a number of television pilots and individual episodes of various television series through the early 1980s. She returned to acting in 2012, appearing in a number of direct-to-video productions.

Filmography

Film

Television

References

External links

 Kristine DeBell's website.
 
 
 
 Meatballs movie website

Actresses from New York (state)
Female models from New York (state)
American film actresses
American soap opera actresses
American television actresses
People from Chatham, New York
1954 births
Living people
20th-century American actresses
American pornographic film actresses
21st-century American women